Sir Richard George Bramwell McCombe, PC (born 23 September 1952), Is an English barrister and former member of the Court of Appeal of England and Wales.

McCombe attended Sedbergh School and Downing College, Cambridge. He was called to the Bar in 1975 (Lincoln's Inn) and elected a bencher in 1996. He was second junior counsel to the Director-General of Fair Trading from 1982 to 1987, when he became first junior counsel, serving until 1989. The same year, he was made a Queen's Counsel. McCombe and Price Waterhouse executive John Heywood led an investigation into Norton Group, plc for the Department of Trade and Industry.

He became an Assistant Recorder in 1993 and a Recorder in 1996. He was appointed a Deputy High Court judge in 1999. From 1996 to 2001, he served as Attorney-General of the Duchy of Lancaster. He was appointed to the High Court on 11 January 2001, Receiving the customary knighthood, and was assigned to the Queen's Bench Division. He served as Presiding Judge on the Northern Circuit from 2004 to 2007 and Chair of the Association of High Court Judges from 2008 to 2009. On 26 October 2012, he was appointed a Lord Justice of Appeal And received the customary appointment to the Privy Council. He retired from the Court of Appeal with effect from 27 January 2021.

He was the presiding judge in the case concerning elderly torture victims in the Mau Mau Uprising, in which McCombe repeatedly ruled in their favour against the British government, paving the way for their eventual compensation. He also presided over the trial of Sharon Matthews and Michael Donovan for the kidnapping of Shannon Matthews in 2008.

Sir Richard is married to Jill Black, Lady Black of Derwent, a former Justice of the Supreme Court of the United Kingdom.

Arms

See also
 List of Lords Justices of Appeal

References

1952 births
Living people
Welsh King's Counsel
Knights Bachelor
Members of the Privy Council of the United Kingdom
20th-century English judges
Alumni of Downing College, Cambridge
Lords Justices of Appeal
20th-century Welsh lawyers
21st-century English judges
Queen's Bench Division judges